Sheareria is a genus of Chinese plants in the tribe Astereae within the family Asteraceae.

Species
The only known species is Sheareria nana, native to China (Provinces of Anhui, Guangdong, Guizhou, Hubei, Hunan, Jiangsu, Jiangxi, Shaanxi, Sichuan, Yunnan, Zhejiang).

References

Astereae
Monotypic Asteraceae genera
Endemic flora of China